Falsterite is a rare phosphate mineral with the formula Ca2MgMn2+2(Fe2+0.5Fe3+0.5)4Zn4(PO4)8(OH)4(H2O)14. It is a pegmatitic mineral, related to the currently approved mineral ferraioloite.

Occurrence and association
Falsterite was found in Palermo No. 1 pegmatite, North Groton, Grafton County, New Hampshire, US. Co-type locality is pegmatite at Estes quarry, Baldwin, Cumberland County, Maine, US. Falsterite is a product of alteration of triphylite and sphalerite.

Crystal structure
Main features of the crystal structure of falsterite, which is somewhat similar to that of schoonerite, are:
 chains of Fen+O6 octahedra, displaying edge-sharing
 chains of ZnO4 tetrahedra, that display corner-sharing
 sheets, parallel to {010}, formed by linking the above two types of chains by PO4 tetrahedra
 slabs formed by linking the sheets with MnO6 octahedra and CaO7 polyhedra
The slabs are bridged by dimers of MgO6 octahedra that display edge-sharing. Magnesium-bearing octahedra share edges with zinc-bearing tetrahedra.

References

Zinc minerals
Calcium minerals
Magnesium minerals
Manganese(II) minerals
Iron(II,III) minerals
Phosphate minerals
Monoclinic minerals
Minerals in space group 14
Minerals described in 2012